St George's Channel is the sea channel between Ireland and Wales, connecting the Irish Sea to the Celtic Sea. 

St George's Channel may also refer to:
 St. George's Channel (Papua New Guinea), a sea channel between New Ireland and New Britain
 St. George's Channel, Nova Scotia, a community in Canada
 Sfântu Gheorghe branch of the Danube Delta